Safari de Peaugres is an 80 ha zoo in the Peaugres area of Auvergne-Rhône-Alpes, near Annonay. It is one of the largest tourist attractions in departement of Ardèche. The zoo presents 800 animals from 120 species. Monkey World have rescued a white-faced saki female from here called Chloe in 2016.

The zoo is a member of the European Association of Zoos and Aquaria (EAZA) and the World Association of Zoos and Aquariums (WAZA).

References

External links

 Official website

Zoos in France
Buildings and structures in Ardèche
Tourist attractions in Ardèche
Zoos established in 1974
Organizations based in Auvergne-Rhône-Alpes